Kurt Gieseler (born 21 January 1933) is a former German cyclist. He competed in the team pursuit event at the 1956 Summer Olympics.

References

External links
 

1933 births
Living people
German male cyclists
Olympic cyclists of the United Team of Germany
Cyclists at the 1956 Summer Olympics
Place of birth missing (living people)